Amigo and Friends (also known in Spanish as Cantinflas y Sus Amigos) is an educational children's cartoon that was based on the Mexican cartoon series Cantinflas Show in 1979. The show, which concentrates on a wide range of subjects intended to educate children, follows Amigo, a little comical character from Mexico, who goes on educational adventures through time and space and gets to visit Shakespeare, see the ancient pyramids, and even travels to other planets. The animated Amigo is based on the legendary character, Cantinflas played by the Mexican actor and comedian Mario Moreno Reyes.

The show was created and produced by Televisa. The company was also responsible for the distribution of the show in Mexico.

In 1982, Hanna-Barbera Productions dubbed the series into English and retitled it Amigo and Friends and aired in syndication across the United States through Viacom Enterprises. The only two known actors were John Stephenson, who narrates each episode and Don Messick, who voiced Amigo.

Amigo and Friends in other languages
 Le tour du monde de Cantinflas (A Trip of the World with Cantinflas; French)
 עמיקו וחבריו (Amiko Ve'Haverav) (Hebrew)
 笑星和他的朋友们 (Comedian and his friends) (Chinese)
 Amigo (Swedish)
 Амиго приключения около планетата (Amigo's adventures around the planet; Bulgarian)
 Pablo (Dutch)

Home media
Sometime in the 1980s, a couple of episodes were released on video by Family Home Entertainment. In 2004, BCI released some of the shorts as part of the Cantinflas Show collection.

Episodes 
Source: 

 Meets Alexander Bell
 Visits the Amazon
 Meets Amerigo Vespucci
 Learns Atomic Energy
 Meets Baseball
 Visits the Canals of Venice
 Meets Captain Cook
 Visit the Colosseum
 Meets the Constellations
 Meets Daniel Boone
 Meets Don Quixote
 Visit the Eiffel Tower
 Meets Eli Whitney and the cotton gin
 Visit the Estate of Vatican City
 Meets Father Junipero Serra
 Learns the game of rugby
 Meets Genghis Khan
 Meets George Washington Carver
 Visit the Grand Canyon
 Visit the great wall of china
 Meets the golf story
 Meets Henry Ford
 In the international date line
 Meet James Watt
 Meets Julius Caesar
 Meets King Tut
 Meets Lewis and Clark
 Meets the lost city of Atlantis
 Meets Luther Burbank
 Meets Madame Curie
 Meets Michelangelo
 Meets the Milky Way
 Visit Mont Saint Michel
 Climbs Mount Everest
 On the Nile
 Visit Notre Dame
 Visit the Parthenon
 Meets Picasso
 Visit the planets
 Visit the pyramids
 Meets Rembrandt
 Learns Safety tips
 Meets Simon Bolivar
 Meets Statue of Liberty
 Meets Soccer
 The Sun
 Meets Tennis
 Visit the Tower of London
 Visit the Universe
 Visit the Wailing Wall
 Visit Yellowstone Park
 Visit Yosemite

References

External links
 Harry McCracken: The Cantinflas Chronicles
 Retrojunk: Amigo and Friends
 

Television series by CBS Studios 
Television series by Hanna-Barbera
Mexican children's animated television series
Las Estrellas original programming
1970s Mexican television series
1970s animated television series
1980s Mexican television series
1979 Mexican television series debuts
1982 Mexican television series endings
Children's education television series
Animated television series about children